Route 368 is a collector road in the Canadian province of Nova Scotia.

It is located in Cumberland County and connects Mahoneys Corner at Trunk 4 with Head of Wallace Bay at Trunk 6. It was originally a part of Trunk 4 until 1970 .

Communities
Mahoneys Corner
Streets Ridge
South Middleboro
Middleboro
North Middleboro
Fountain Road
Head of Wallace Bay

History

Before the 1960s, the section of the Collector Highway 368 from Streets Ridge to Mahoneys Corner was designated as Trunk Highway 4.

See also
List of Nova Scotia provincial highways

References

Nova Scotia provincial highways
Roads in Cumberland County, Nova Scotia